Tamaryn Green-Nxumalo (born 19 August 1994) is a South African beauty pageant titleholder who was crowned Miss South Africa 2018. She represented South Africa in the Miss Universe 2018 competition and placed as the first runner-up.

Early life and education
Green was born on 19 August 1994 in Worcester, Western Cape to parents David Green and Ellirene Green. Originally from Worcester, the family moved to Paarl when Green was nine years old. She is of Cape Coloured origin. Her father works as a curriculum adviser while her mother is a teacher. Green attended New Orleans Secondary School in Paarl.

Green studied medicine at the University of Cape Town, graduating with a medical degree in 2019. In June 2015, she was diagnosed with tuberculosis while a medical student; she entered remission in December 2015.

Green married businessman Ze Nxumalo on April 6, 2022 at the Quoin Rock Wine Estate in Stellenbosch, South Africa.

Pageantry
Green was initially announced as one of the 28 regional qualifiers for Miss South Africa 2018 in April 2018. She later was able to advance to the televised competition as one of the top twelve competitors. During the final competition, Green advanced into the top five and then into the top two, where she was crowned Miss Universe South Africa 2018 by outgoing titleholder, Demi-Leigh Nel-Peters, becoming the South African representative in Miss Universe 2018. Afterwards, she was crowned Miss South Africa 2018 with Miss World South Africa being Thulisa Keyi. She was crowned by her predecessor Adè van Heerden.

As Miss South Africa 2018, Green went on to represent South Africa at Miss Universe 2018. During the final word round, each delegate was asked the same question: "What is the most important lesson you've learned and how will you apply it to your time as Miss Universe?" Green replied:

References

External links

1994 births
Cape Coloureds
Living people
Miss Universe 2018 contestants
Miss South Africa winners
People from Worcester, South Africa
South African beauty pageant winners
South African female models
University of Cape Town alumni
South African Christians